The ABC sitcom series Growing Pains aired from September 24, 1985, to April 25, 1992, with 166 episodes produced spanning seven seasons.

Series overview

Episodes

Season 1 (1985–86)

Season 2 (1986–87)

Season 3 (1987–88)

Season 4 (1988–89)

Season 5 (1989–90)

Season 6 (1990–91)

Season 7 (1991–92)

TV films

References

External links

Lists of American sitcom episodes
Episodes